Kosalesvara temple or Kosaleswara temple located at Baidyanatha of Subarnapur district, Odisha, India. In the balcony of the brick-built jagamohana hall of this temple a peculiar Kirtimukha head is carved on brick. From the mouth of this kirtimukha a bunches of leaves are flowing down. Such arts are found carved on the Laksmanesvara temple located at Sirpur of the Chhattisgarh state, which was built on 8th century.

See also
 Kosalananda Kavya
 Subarnameru Temple
 Patali Srikhetra

References

Shiva temples in Odisha
Hindu temples in Subarnapur district